Claife Heights is an upland area in the Lake District, near to Windermere in Cumbria, England. It has a topographic prominence of  so is classified as a Marilyn (a hill with prominence of at least 150m).

It is the subject of a chapter of Wainwright's book The Outlying Fells of Lakeland.  He describes a clockwise circuit starting at Far Sawrey and passing Moss Eccles Tarn. He says "Claife Heights is delightful. It was more so before forestry curtailed walking and restricted the views." and describes it as "No definite summit. Highest parts about 900ft."

References

Marilyns of England
Fells of the Lake District
South Lakeland District